Belmont College is a public community college in St. Clairsville, Ohio. Main campus is located in St. Clairsville, Ohio, United States. The college was founded in 1971 and has served the Ohio Valley communities for over 30 years.  Belmont offers instruction in a variety of career fields. Belmont College has other locations that include the Monroe County Center located in Woodsfield, Ohio and the North Center located in Cadiz, Ohio.

Student life 
Organizations include Student Government Association (SGA), Phi Theta Kappa (PTK), Flag Football Team, Children’s Holiday Party Committee, Belmont College Alumni Association, and Civil War Discussion. In addition to these organizations there are specific organizations for programs. These include Licensed Practical Nurse Association of Ohio (LPNAO), Building Preservation (BPR) Student Association, Association of Information Technology Professionals (AITP), and the Association of Student Medical Assistants (ASMA).

Accreditation 
Belmont College is accredited by the Higher Learning Commission (HLC).

References

External links 
Official Website

Educational institutions established in 1971
Education in Belmont County, Ohio
Buildings and structures in Belmont County, Ohio
Community colleges in Ohio
1971 establishments in Ohio